Lhuentse,is a town and headquarter of eponymous Lhuentse District in northeastern Bhutan. It is about 70 km from Mongar, 145 km from Trashigang and 452 km from the national capital Thimpu. Nearest airport is Yongphulla Airport 130 km away. 

Lhuentse consists of eight Gewogs, namely Gangzur, Jaray, Kurtoe, Khoma, Maenbi, Maedtsho, Minjey, and Tsaenkhar.

Development plans
It is also the site of proposed joint "India-Bhutan Lhuntse Advanced Landing Ground" (AGL) capable of handling large transport aircraft and fighter jets.

Tourism
It is the location of the Lhuentse Dzong, Bumdeling Wildlife Sanctuary in Trashiyangtse district is just to the northeast, and Tawang in India lies to the east.

Administration
The postal code for Lhuentse is 45001.

See also 
Bhutan–India relations
Bhutan–India border
Bhutan–China border
Line of Actual Control

References

External links 

Satellite map at Maplandia.com

Populated places in Bhutan